Polygamy in Utah is covered by these articles:
 Polygamy in North America
 Mormonism and polygamy
 Current state of polygamy in the Latter Day Saint movement